Santiago Gerardo Rojas López (born 5 April 1996) is a Paraguay international footballer who plays for Nacional, as a goalkeeper.

Career
Rojas made his debut and played only for Nacional.

International
Rojas was called up to the Paraguay squad for the first time in November 2018.

References

1996 births
Living people
Paraguayan footballers
Club Nacional footballers
Paraguay international footballers
Association football goalkeepers
Sportspeople from Luque